The 1932 U.S. National Championships (now known as the US Open) was a tennis tournament that took place on the outdoor grass courts at the West Side Tennis Club, Forest Hills in New York City, United States. The tournament ran from 3 September until 10 September. It was the 52nd staging of the U.S. National Championships and the fourth Grand Slam tennis event of the year.

Finals

Men's singles

 Ellsworth Vines defeated  Henri Cochet  6–4, 6–4, 6–4

Women's singles

 Helen Jacobs defeated  Carolin Babcock  6–2, 6–2

Men's doubles
 Ellsworth Vines /  Keith Gledhill defeated  Wilmer Allison /  John Van Ryn 6–4, 6–3, 6–2

Women's doubles
 Helen Jacobs /  Sarah Palfrey defeated  Alice Marble /  Marjorie Morrill 8–6, 6–1

Mixed doubles
 Sarah Palfrey /  Fred Perry defeated  Helen Jacobs /  Ellsworth Vines 6–3, 7–5

References

External links
Official US Open website

 
U.S. National Championships
U.S. National Championships (tennis) by year
U.S. National Championships
U.S. National Championships
U.S. National Championships
U.S. National Championships